Ong Ching-ming (born 13 October 1968) is a Taiwanese alpine skier. He competed at the 1984, the 1988 and the 1992 Winter Olympics.

References

1968 births
Living people
Taiwanese male alpine skiers
Olympic alpine skiers of Taiwan
Alpine skiers at the 1984 Winter Olympics
Alpine skiers at the 1988 Winter Olympics
Alpine skiers at the 1992 Winter Olympics
Place of birth missing (living people)